The 2013–14 season of the Bayernliga, the second highest association football league in Bavaria, was the sixth season of the league at tier five (V) of the German football league system and the 69th season overall since establishment of the league in 1945. The regular season started on 19 July 2013 and finished on 24 May 2014, followed by relegation play-off games. The league season was interrupted by a winter break, which lasted from late November 2013 to the early March 2014.

The league, operating in two regional divisions, north and south, was won by SpVgg Bayreuth (North) and BC Aichach (South). It was the eights league title for SpVgg Bayreuth while BC Aichach won the league for the first time. Aichach did not take up its right for promotion, however, instead withdrawing from the Bayernliga to the Kreisliga for financial reasons.

Modus
Each division of the Bayernliga consisted of 18 clubs who would play each other in a home-and-away format. No league games would be played between clubs from different divisions during the regular season. The champions of each division were directly promoted to the Regionalliga, subject to fulfilling the licensing regulations of the later. No Bayernliga championship game was played between the two league winners. The runners-up of each league take part in promotion round with the 16th and 15th placed clubs in the Regionalliga. Should the runners-up not receive approval for a Regionalliga licence this playoff spot is passed down to the highest placed club with a licence approval. The four clubs play for one more spot in the Regionalliga in 2014–15 unless the Regionalliga champions, FC Bayern Munich II win promotion to the 3. Liga, in which case two spots in the league become available.

The bottom two teams in each division are directly relegated while the 15th and 16th as well as the 14th placed team with the lesser points take part in the relegation playoffs with the Landesliga runners-up. However, this modus was affected by the voluntary Withdrew of BC Aichach and Wacker Burghausen II from the southern division, where both teams thereby filled the two direct relegation spots and no other team was directly relegated.

2013–14 Standings

Bayernliga Nord 
The division featured four new clubs with SpVgg SV Weiden and SV Erlenbach having been promoted from the Landesliga while SC Eltersdorf and VfL Frohnlach had been relegated from the Regionalliga. Additionally, SSV Jahn Regensburg II had been transferred from the southern division to the northern.

Bayernliga Süd 
The division featured six new clubs with TSV Bogen, SV Pullach, SV Raisting, VfR Garching and FC Pipinsried having been promoted from the Landesliga while FC Ismaning had been relegated from the Regionalliga.

Top goalscorers
The top goal scorers for the season:

Nord

Süd

Promotion play-offs
Promotion/relegation play-offs were held at the end of the season for both the Regionalliga above and the Bayernliga:

To the Regionalliga

First round
The 15th and 16th placed Regionalliga teams play the runners-up of the northern division and the third placed team in the south. Both Bayernliga teams failed to earn promotion while 1. FC Schweinfurt 05 retained its league place and TSV 1860 Rosenheim was relegated:
First leg

Second leg

Rosenheim won 3−2 on aggregate.

Schweinfurt won 7−3 on aggregate.

Second round
The winners of the first round play each other for the one available spot in the Regionalliga:
First leg

Second leg

Schweinfurt won 6–1 on aggregate.

To the Bayernliga
The second placed teams of each of the five Landesliga division, together with the worst 14th placed team and the 15th and 16th placed teams from the two Bayernligas enter a play-off for the remaining three places in the 2014–15 Bayernliga.

Group A
Group A is a four team group:
First round – first leg

First round – second leg

Viktoria Kahl won 4-1 on aggregate.

Alemannia Haibach won 5-2 on aggregate.
Second round – first leg

Second round – second leg

Alemannia Haibach won 3–2 on aggregate.

Group B
Group B is a three team group:
First round – first leg

First round – second leg

4-4 on aggregate. FC Affing won on away goals rule.
Second round – first leg

Second round – second leg

DJK Vilzing won 3–2 on aggregate.

Group C
Group C is a three team group:
First round – first leg

First round – second leg

TuS Holzkirchen won 2-1 on aggregate.
Second round – first leg

Second round – second leg

BCF Wolfratshausen won 2–1 on aggregate.

References

External links 
 Official website  of the Bavarian Football Association 
 Bayernliga Nord 2013–14 on Fupa.net 
 Bayernliga Süd 2013–14 on Fupa.net 

2013-14
Bayern